Yaquina Bay State Recreation Site, established in 1948, is a coastal state park in west-central Lincoln County, Oregon, United States, in the city of Newport.  It is administered by the Oregon Parks and Recreation Department, and located at the north end of Yaquina Bay near its outlet to the Pacific Ocean.  The site includes picnic facilities, beach access, a fisherman's memorial shrine, a forested bluff and the historic Yaquina Bay Lighthouse.

See also 
 List of Oregon State Parks

References

External links 
 

State parks of Oregon
Oregon Coast
Newport, Oregon
Parks in Lincoln County, Oregon
1948 establishments in Oregon